Consumed is a Canadian reality television series produced by Paperny Entertainment that airs on HGTV Canada. The series stars de-cluttering expert Jill Pollack, who challenges families overwhelmed by their possessions to survive for 30 days with only the bare essentials. After the 30 days are over the families must decide which possession they truly need and which to donate. The series, which films largely in the Metro Vancouver area, premiered on August 30, 2011. The second season premiered on June 8, 2013.

References

External links
 

HGTV (Canada) original programming
2012 Canadian television series debuts
2010s Canadian reality television series